José de Vargas Ponce (Cadiz, 1760–1821) was a Spanish erudite, satirical poet and writer.

Works
Praise of Alfonso the Wise, 1782.
Descriptions of the Islands and Balearic Pithiusas, 1787.
Declamation on abuses introduced into the Castilian, presented and awarded at the Spanish Academy, 1791.
Proclamation of a bachelor, 1827, burlesque poem in octaves.
Dissertation on bullfighting, written in 1807 and published in London, by the Royal Academy of History in 1961.
Description of Cartagena, Murcia, 1978
Lucio Marineo Siculus Life
Abdalaziz and Egilona, neoclassical tragedy.

Spanish male writers
Spanish sailors
Members of the Royal Spanish Academy
People from Cádiz
1760 births
1821 deaths